The following lists events that happened in 2012 in Finland.

Incumbents
President – Tarja Halonen, Sauli Niinistö 
Prime Minister – Jyrki Katainen
Speaker – Eero Heinäluoma

Events
22 January and 5 February – the 2012 Finnish presidential election
26 May – the Hyvinkää shooting
27 July - 12 August – 56 athletes competed for Finland at the 2012 Summer Olympics

Deaths

13 February – Tonmi Lillman, musician (b. 1973)
9 March – Jammu Siltavuori, murderer and sexual offender (born 1926)
5 May – Aatos Erkko, newspaper editor and publisher (b. 1932)
10 May – Pekka Marjamäki, ice hockey player (b. 1947)
2 June – Soini Nikkinen, javelin thrower (b. 1923).
18 July – Seppo Liitsola, ice hockey player (b. 1933)
21 September – Karl-Gustav Kaisla, ice hockey referee (b. 1943)
27 September – Eija Inkeri, stage and film actress (b. 1926)
13 December – Sakari Jurkka, actor (b. 1923)
27 December – Jorma Kortelainen, cross country skier and competitive rower (b. 1932).

References

 
2010s in Finland
Finland
Finland
Years of the 21st century in Finland